Florida's 8th House District elects one member of the Florida House of Representatives. The district is represented by Ramon Alexander. The district is located in the Florida Panhandle, and encompasses part of the Big Bend. The district covers all of Gadsden County, as well as central Leon County. The largest city in the district is state capital Tallahassee, though this district excludes the downtown and northeastern portions of the city. As of the 2010 Census, the district's population is 156,188. This district is majority-minority.

This district covers part of the eastern Panhandle, including the heavily African-American population in Gadsden County and the college population in the Tallahassee metropolitan area. As a result, it has skewed heavily Democratic, with Republicans almost never contesting it.

This district contains Florida A&M University, Tallahassee Community College, and a campus of Flagler College, all located in Tallahassee. The district also contains Tallahassee International Airport.

James Harold Thompson served as the Speaker of the Florida House of Representatives from 1984 until 1986.

Representatives from 1967 to the present

See also 

 Florida's 3rd Senate district
 Florida's 5th congressional district

References 

08
Gadsden County, Florida
Leon County, Florida
Tallahassee, Florida